The Michel Band is an Indigenous nation of central Alberta, Canada, which the Government of Canada recognized as a nation and treaty partner from 1878 to 1958.  The descendents of that historic band, now organized as an association called the Michel First Nation, are engaged in legal and political action to regain recognition.

The Michel Band was also referred to as the Michel Caillehoo, Michel Caillehouis, Michel Caillehow, Michel Calihoo, Michel Calistrois, or Michel Calliho Band, referring to the name of their chief at the time that they signed Treaty 6 with the Canadian Crown by adhesion on September 3, 1878.

The reserve was described and surveyed in September 1880 by G.A. Simpsona as "to a post on the right bank of the Sturgeon River and thence easterly along the said bank of the river to the point of beginning, containing an area of forty square miles more or less." and formalized by Order in Council PC 1151 on May 17, 1889.

Like all First Nations in the Edmonton area, the Michel Band members came under government and settler pressure to surrender their agricultural land.  Land sales marked by government corruption steadily eroded their land base through the next half-century. In 1959 the entire band was "enfranchised"—removed from status as Indians in exchange for the right to vote in Canadian elections and removal from the strictures of the Indian Act on March 31, 1958, by Order in Council P.C. 375. The Michel Band was the only one in Canada to be enfranchised during the twentieth century.

The people of the modern-day Michel First Nation have ancestry primarily from the Iroquois, Cree and Métis ethnic groups.  In 1998, there were over 700 registered descendants.

History 

Michel band, composed of Iroquois and their leader, called "Yellowhead", travelled from the east to avoid assassination because of a bounty offered by the American government for provable deaths of Iroquois people.  Iroquois Yellowhead was rumoured to be a descendant of the French Crown from a period when the Iroquois were invited and visited the French King.  He, Yellowhead, believed he had to leave the east to avoid being assassinated during the French Revolution, because of his rumored connection to the French aristocracy.

When Yellowhead came to St. Albert, in Alberta, he appealed to Father Lacombe to arrange a home for himself and his people; his family.   Michel Reserve north of St. Albert, became their land base.   Almost the entire band enfranchised; gave up their Reserve and Treaty rights, when Alberta became a province in 1905, because as Iroquois people, their style of government was based on voting, [American democracy is based on the Iroquois style of government, each individual having the right to vote] and when the colonial government decided that Indians on reserves, and Indigenous people who signed treaties, were not allowed to vote, most of Michel Band gave up their reserve, their treaty rights and moved into St. Albert so that they could vote.
In 1958, the Michel Band became the only First Nation in Canada in the  20th century to enfranchise.

In 1985 many descendants of the historic Michel Band regained Indian status through Bill C-31. They have since that time lobbied the federal government to once again recognize them as an Indian band with Aboriginal and treaty rights.
Many Michel Band members trace their ancestry to Louis Callihoo, a name used by people who could not spell his Iroquois name.  He was called "Yellowhead" and known as Kara Komptee, Kwarakwante.  He was Mohawk (Mohawks are part of the Iroquois confederacy), born in 1782, Sault St. Louis, in what is now called Kahnawake, Quebec. 
He was known as  "Le Soleil Voyageur", which may be a reference to the rumored relationship to the French aristocracy; the French king, Louis XIV, known as "the Sun King".
In 1800, Louis Kwarkwante, Yellowhead, signed on as a voyageur with the North West Company (a clerk changed his name to Caliheue) and travelled west from Montreal  to Northern Alberta to work as a fur trader. He married three local women (a Sekani Native and two French-Cree Métis sisters). Mohawk, an Iroquois language, may at one time have been the language of the band, but by the late 19th Century Father Albert Lacombe wrote that most band members spoke Cree or French. It seems likely that Michif, a mixed Cree-French language, was used by the Michel Band.
Michel Band’s descendants still live across Canada.  Descendants such as bassist, filmmaker, and photographer Tegan Armstrong number among them.

The Michel Band emerged as a distinct cultural and kinship group during the Canadian fur trade.

Daniel Garacontié 

Daniel Garacontié  (also spelled Garagonthie, Garakontie, and Garakontié) an Onondaga sachem, chief and orator, first travelled northwest from the communities of Caughnawaga and St.Regis.  Generations of Iroquois had been trapping furs for a living and had become proficient in the trading of goods to maintain a comfortable lifestyle in the St.Lawrence River and Great Lakes regions. 

The Iroquois were politically governed by the traditional customs and governance of the Great Law of Peace. In 1645 Iroquois headmen began treating the Frenchmen of Trois-Rivières, the Hurons, and Algonquins. In their dealings with the French, Iroquois diplomats adapted the language and rituals of the Great Law of Peace to create the protocol for intercultural diplomacy. In 1654, Daniel Garakontie or "The Moving Sun" was the Great Sachem of the Iroquois Confederacy."Five whole Nations address thee through my mouth. I have in my heart the sentiments of all the Iroquois Nations - and my tongue is faithful to my heart." -GarakontieGarakontie was known as Sagochiendagehte ("the name bearer") the Council name of the Onondaga - a status he occupied as its principal speaker. Garakontie was his family name and not his hereditary title, thus his status as speaker and chief diplomat was achieved, not ascribed by his membership into the Bear Clan. The first references to Garakontié reveal him struggling to preserve the general peace of 1653.

While in Quebec Garakontie proclaimed his faith in Christianity. Garakontié was baptized in the Cathedral of Quebec.  He announced he would no longer sponsor dream feasts and declared the Iroquois cosmology was a fable. Traditionalist Iroquois headmen maintained that Garakontie had become French and untrustworthy The Jesuits had not only created Catholic converts, but also strong Christian and Traditionalist factions that brought unprecedented disquiet to Iroquois communities.

By the late 1660s Jesuit missionaries encouraged increasing numbers of Catholic Iroquois to desert their homes for the mission villages in Canada; by the mid 1670s over two-hundred had departed. The lack of pelts to trade and warfare created serious economic hardship in Iroquoia. In 1700, over 500 of their 2000 warriors had been killed, captured, or had deserted to Catholic missions.

Louis Kwarakwante 
Louis Kwarakwante ("The Sun Traveller") was born in 1782 near the Catholic Mission of Saul St. Louis of Caughnawaga. It is speculated that Louis was Mohawk. The name Kwarakwante appears to be an incorrect translation of Garakontie. Records list his surname variously as "Karaconti. Karaquienthe, Caraquanti." Louis also went by the surname of Callihoo, which derived from "Karhioo" meaning  "Tall Forest" in Iroquois. Many members of his family, especially those who went west with the Fur Trade, had the name Karakontie bestowed on them by the clergy. Louis Kwarakwante was likely a grandson of Daniel Garakontie.

As early as 1800, the North West Company began to employ Iroquois voyagers. Colin Robertson said he preferred the Iroquois voyageurs to French-Canadians in a rapid or dangerous river crossing "for their calmness and presence of mind which never forsakes them in the greatest danger." This was still a common trend even up until 1872, when George Grant remarked:"Our crews were chiefly Iroquois Indians from Caugh-naw-aga, near Montreal, the best voyagers known, according to the testimony of everyone who has tried them. The Iroquois made the engagement for the trip, and hired a few Ojibways bear the Shebandowan and Fort Francis to make up the necessary number. They were as fine-looking, clean-limbed men as one's eye could desire to rest on, punctual, diligent, uncomplaining, and reserving their chief affection for their canoes. As a jockey cherishes his horse and  shepherd his dog, so do they care for their canoe."  The NWC undoubtedly hired Iroquois from Caughnawaga not only for their experience, but also their familiarity with the Catholic clergy and the habitant seigneuries who had land holdings in the Missions. The Regardless, the bark longhouses still resembled those of in Mohawk Valley, and traditional agriculture was still practiced. In this Mission, Louis Callihoo learned his catechism and his prayers in his native tongue. He spoke French and later many other languages as well, which no doubt made his commercial dealings easier. He was contracted as a canoemen on November 23, 1800 by McTavish, Frobisher & Company, agents of the NWC.

Enfranchisement and legal dispute 
The Michel First Nation's position is summarized though testimony at the Indigenous and Northern Affairs Committee on April 9, 2008, by Chief Rosalind Callihoo:
I am the great-great-granddaughter of Michel Callihoo, who signed treaty in 1878 by an adhesion to Treaty No. 6. I'm here today on behalf of over 700 members of the Michel First Nation who were reinstated under Bill C-31.

I would like to present to the committee today the issue of discrimination throughout the Michel history. The whole band was enfranchised in 1958 under section 112 of the Indian Act, which was later repealed because it was deemed to be discriminatory.

Bill C-31 was also discriminatory. I stated that 700-plus members have been reinstated. However, there are probably approximately the same number who were not reinstated because they were enfranchised under the band enfranchisement. Bill C-31 did not address that. They only addressed individual enfranchisement.

My third comment regarding discrimination is the specific claims policy and access to it. In 1998 we had concluded an inquiry from the Indian Claims Commission. That inquiry made a recommendation to Canada that Canada should grant the Michel First Nation special standing to file a specific claim. In 2002, after four years, the Minister of Indian Affairs of the day refused to give us that special standing, and the recommendation was not adopted.

Our sole recommendation here today to this committee is to propose an amendment to the definition of first nation in Bill C-30. In order to bring a claim before the Specific Claims Tribunal, a first nation must meet the first nation definition under section 2 of the Indian Act. This defines first nation to mean a band as defined under the act. This definition needs to be expanded to include the Michel First Nation, which would be a first nation if not for Canada's breach of lawful obligation, because Canada's breach goes directly to the status of the Michel First Nation.

The Indian Claims Commission did note that Canada should not benefit because of a technicality. In our case, Canada is still benefiting from its own wrongful act; it points to its own discrimination as the justification for not granting us status as standing under the policy. Parliament would continue this wrong by enacting Bill C-30 without the requested amendment.

One of the purposes of Bill C-30, and the reason why it was endorsed by the Assembly of First Nations, is that it removes the non-binding status of recommendations under the former Indian Claims Commission. Bill C-30 is a positive step, and we endorse it. However, the benefits of Bill C-30, as it is currently drafted, exclude us because of the catch-22 position we are in. We are not recognized as a band, but we say we should be a band. We can't argue that we should be a band.

The basic principles and values of Canadian society are reflected in the constitutional provisions designed to protect the rights of aboriginal peoples, to abolish discrimination. These basic principles and values need to be applied to our situation. We have the same issues before us as all the other first nations in Canada; however, we have no platform to bring them forward.

We respectfully urge the committee to recommend that Bill C-30 be amended so we may have equal access to the legal processes that Bill C-30 set out.

References 

First Nations history in the District of Alberta
Métis in Alberta

Franco-Albertan culture
Government agencies disestablished in 1958
1958 disestablishments in Canada
First Nations in Alberta